Robert Marshall (born 1964) is a Scottish international lawn and indoor bowler.

He won double bronze in the triples and fours at the 2000 World Outdoor Bowls Championship in Johannesburg and is the older brother of Alex Marshall.

References

Living people
Scottish male bowls players
1964 births
Date of birth missing (living people)
Place of birth missing (living people)